The Orlo was an early American motor car.

Orlo or Orło may also refer to:

Places
Orło, Masovian Voivodeship (east-central Poland)
Orło, Podlaskie Voivodeship (north-east Poland)
Orło, Warmian-Masurian Voivodeship (north Poland)

People
Orlo M. Brees (1896–1980), New York politician